The Du Toit Mountains are a group of mountains about  long and  wide, to the south-west of the Wilson Mountains in southeastern Palmer Land, Antarctica.

They were first photographed from the air by the U.S. Antarctic Service in 1940; rephotographed by the U.S. Navy, 1966–69, and mapped from the photographs by the U.S. Geological Survey. In association with the names of continental drift scientists grouped in this area, they were named by the Advisory Committee on Antarctic Names after Alexander du Toit, a South African geologist who was an early proponent of the theory of continental drift.

Features
 Mount Marquis
 Mount Wever
 Peck Range

References 

Mountain ranges of Palmer Land